The 1998 Toledo Rockets football team was an American football team that represented the University of Toledo in the Mid-American Conference (MAC) during the 1998 NCAA Division I-A football season. In their eighth season under head coach Gary Pinkel, the Rockets compiled a 7–5 record (6–2 against MAC opponents), finished in first place in the MAC's West Division, lost to Marshall in the MAC Football Championship Game (17–23), and outscored all opponents by a combined total of 229 to 216.

The team's statistical leaders included Chris Wallace with 2,476 passing yards, Wasean Tait with 625 rushing yards, and Ray Curry with 513 receiving yards.

Schedule

References

Toledo
Toledo Rockets football seasons
Toledo Rockets football